Nalerigu is one of the constituencies represented in the Parliament of Ghana. It elects one Member of Parliament (MP) by the first past the post system of election. It is located in the North East Region of Ghana. 

The current member of Parliament for the constituency is Alhaji Seidu Issifu Baba. In 2016, she was elected on the ticket of the New Patriotic Party (NPP) and won with over 53% of the votes.

See also
List of Ghana Parliament constituencies

References 

Parliamentary constituencies in the North East Region (Ghana)